Jane B. Korn was the first woman dean of the Gonzaga University School of Law (2011-2018).
She was previously a professor and vice dean at James E. Rogers College of Law and an attorney at Davis Polk & Wardwell.

Early life and career
Korn is a graduate of the Rutgers University. She has a degree in law from University of Colorado Law School, earning the distinction of Order of the Coif.  Following graduation from law school Korn clerked for the United States Court of Appeals for the Tenth Circuit in Denver, Colorado.

Korn was elected chair of the dean's section of the Association of American Law Schools (AALS).

References

Living people
University of Colorado Law School alumni
Rutgers University alumni
Deans of law schools in the United States
Davis Polk & Wardwell lawyers
Year of birth missing (living people)